The Dance Hall (Swedish: Danssalongen) is a 1955 Swedish musical drama film directed by Börje Larsson and starring Elof Ahrle, Sonja Wigert and Lars Ekborg. It was shot at the Kungsholmen Studios of Nordisk Tonefilm in Stockholm. The film's sets were designed by the art director Bibi Lindström.

Cast
 Elof Ahrle as Viktor
 Sonja Wigert as 	Ria
 Lars Ekborg as 	'Doggen' Andersson
 Gunvor Pontén as 	Sonja Gren
 Lennart Lindberg as 	Bill
 Ingrid Thulin as 	Cecilia
 Naima Wifstrand as	'Madame'
 Sten Gester as 	Bengt
 Märta Dorff as 	Ofelia
 Mats Bahr as 	Oskar
 Lasse Sarri as Georg
 Birgitta Olzon as Minna
 Hans Bergström as 	Göran
 Bengt Blomgren as 	Josef Ek
 Sonja Westerbergh as 	Marianne Stern
 Gösta Prüzelius as 	Rolf Svensson
 Catrin Westerlund as Majsan
 Olof Sandborg as Doctor 
 Hanny Schedin as 	Maid 
 Georg Skarstedt as 	Sonja's Neighbor 
 Kristina Adolphson as 	Greta
 Gunnar Svensson as 	Musician 
 Bengt-Arne Wallin as Musician 
 Egil Johansen as Musician 
 Gösta Krantz as Manager 
 Jessie Flaws as 	Girl Dancing with Göran
 Monica Nielsen as 	Girl at the Nightclub

References

Bibliography 
 Iverson, Gunnar, Soderbergh Widding, Astrid & Soila, Tytti. Nordic National Cinemas. Routledge, 2005.

External links 
 

1955 films
Swedish drama films
1955 drama films
1950s Swedish-language films
Films directed by Börje Larsson
Swedish black-and-white films
1950s Swedish films